Razmik Grigoryan (January 27, 1985, village Zarinja, Talin Region, Aragatsotn Province, Armenia), is an Armenian writer, filmmaker:

Early life 
Grigoryan was born on January 27, 1985, in Zarinja village, Talin Region, Aragatsotn Province. He graduated from the local school. In 2003 he entered Yerevan State College of Culture, in the Department of Film. Razmik served in the Army from 2003 to 2005. He graduated in 2008. He studied The Art of Cinema (Documentary filmmaking course) at Yerevan State Institute of Theatre and Cinematography from 2011 to 2014.

Career 
He made his first documentary film With Vardan (Armenian: «Վարդանի հետ») in 2013. This film is about Vardan Stepanyan, an Armenian military commander during the First Nagorno-Karabakh War. His first collection of poems Your absence (Armenian: «Քո բացական») was published in 2013. He made documentary film Cross on his back (Armenian: «Խաչը թիկունքին») in 2014 with the contribution of Hayk Documentary Film Studio. The film is about the ophthalmologist Manuk Manukyan, and in 2016 he also presented his short film Requiem (Armenian: «Ռեքվիեմ»).

In 2017 he made the film Inside the light. In the same year the second collection of his poems was published – From the spike to the bread (Armenian: «Հասկից մինչև հաց»), editor Hakob Movses.

His works have been published in Armenian literary magazines and newspapers` Gretert, Grakan Tert, Andin, Narcis, Eghici Luys, Vogu Kanch, and also on Granish Literary Foundation's website.

In 2018 English translations of his poems were published in Adelaide Literary Magazine, Year III, No 12 (translator Maro Ghukasyan).

Filmography 
With Vardan, 2013
Cross on his back, 2014 .
Requiem, 2016
Inside the light, 2017
Willpower, 2020

Books 
Your absence, 2013
From the spike to the bread, 2017
Letters, 2020

References

External links 

The premiere of film “With Vardan” («Վարդանի հետ») 
The literary works by Razmik Grigoryan on “Granish” literary foundation's website
Willpower

1985 births
Living people
21st-century Armenian writers
Armenian film directors